Tehniyat (Arabic word تہنیت), (means "Nalli") is the symbolic gesture of "Warm Tiding". Arabs often take account of this gesture in numerous occasions, particularly while greeting a guest, relative or a friend. However, this rich Arabic word is widely used to name female newborn Muslim babies by the followers of Islam. It is a rare name, however. The true meaning of Tehniyat is "congratulation".

Arab culture